Soltasbruxa (stilized as SOLTASBRUXA or #SOLTASBRUXA, can be translated as "Lethewitchesout") is the debut album by Brazilian band Francisco, el Hombre, released 2 September 2016. It was almost entirely produced by Zé Nigro and the band itself at Estúdio Navegantes in São Paulo, São Paulo. The single "Calor da Rua" was produced by Curumin, who introduced the band to Nigro. The album features guest performances of Liniker and Apanhador Só.

The album release party was held at Audio, in São Paulo, at a show with Argentinian band Onda Vaga. the album features lyrics with political and social commentary, besides a more rock-oriented instrumentation compared to the folk of La Pachanga!. The band intends to release it as CD and vinyl eventually.

Concept and composition 
About the shift in the lyrical themes in comparison with 2015's La Pachanga! EP, vocalist and percussion Sebastián Piracés-Ugarte says:

Vocalist and percussionist Juliana Strassacapa echoed such words in another interview. Vocalist, acoustic guitarist and Sebastián's brother, Mateo, also said:

For the members, there has always been an intention by the band of expressing messages with a political view, but they still hadn't found a way nor a moment for it. About the album title, Mateo said "we have a political thing, we are Third World, we are born losing, but we are born to shot, that's why the album is called Soltasbruxa, we want people to explode during the show, not just to have fun". In another interview, he added:

Some of the songs were created from zero by all members together, like "Triste, Louca ou Má", "Bolso Nada" and "Tá Com Dólar, Tá Com Deus”. The majority of them is totally sung in Portuguese, except for "Como una Flor", "Primavera" and "Sincero", with Spanish-language sections. When asked about the reason to focus on the Portuguese language,Mateo explained:

For a future vinyl release, the band already released Soltasbruxa divided in A and B sides at SoundCloud. According to Sebastián, the division was made so that the album had "a tight, heavy, dense start, which transforms into something lighter as we naturalize what we learn, but with a strong ending to remind us that there is still much for us to learn".

Song information 
Some tracks deal with topics related to feminism, like the single "Calor da Rua", which talks about the domestic violence deep-rooted in society; and "Triste, Louca ou Má", which questions the roles of women in society and features Salma Jô (Carne Doce), Helena Macedo, Larissa Baq and Renata Éssis. Strassacapa, the group's only woman, said that, with this line-up, "it is necessary to bring to our everyday discussions about sexism and gender violence". Both received promotional videos. "Triste, Louca ou Má" was featured at the soundtrack of Rede Globo's telenovela O Outro Lado do Paraíso, being used as the ending theme for the second episode, in which protagonist Clara (Bianca Bin) is raped by her own husband Gael (Sérgio Guizé) in their first night as a married couple. The song was nominated for the 2017 Latin Grammy Award for Best Portuguese Language Song.

"Bolso Nada", featuring Liniker e os Caramelows, criticizes congressman Jair Bolsonaro, without citing him explicitly. Less specifically speaking, the band intend to criticize "these politicians who think that a good criminal is a dead criminal and that there is a gay cure".

"Tá Com Dólar, Tá Com Deus" is a satire of the "aggregated everyday values". In a carnival marchinha rhythm, the track deals with the economical crisis Brazil was facing by the time of the album release and the "devaluing of life next to the money valuing". The song features the band Apanhador Só, which the quintet hosted in Campinas during a tour. According to Sebastián, the track was composed in less than 30 minutes based on a chorus they already sung in early 2015 rehearsals.

Track listing

Personnel 
Francisco, el Hombre
 Sebastián Piracés-Ugarte - vocals, percussion and acoustic guitar
 Mateo Piracés-Ugarte - vocals and acoustic guitar
 Juliana Strassacapa - vocals and percussion
 Andrei Martinez Kozyreff - guitar
 Rafael Gomes - bass, backing vocals

Session musician
 Giovani Loner, Danilo Ciolfi, Anderson Menezes - wind instruments

Technical personnel
 Zé Nigro and Francisco, el Hombre - production
 Gustavo Lenza - mixing
 Felipe Tichauer - mastering
 Curumin - production on "Calor da Rua"
 Fernando Narcizo - mixing on "Calor da Rua"
 Amanda Paschoal - art

Notes

References 

2016 debut albums
Francisco, el Hombre albums
Spanish-language albums
Portuguese-language albums